Felicena is a genus of skipper butterflies in the family Hesperiidae.

Species
Felicena dirpha Boisduval, 1832
Felicena dora Evans, 1949

References

Natural History Museum Lepidoptera genus database
Felicena at funet

Hesperiidae genera
Trapezitinae